Division of Bosnia and Herzegovina may refer to:

 Political divisions of Bosnia and Herzegovina
 Partition of Bosnia and Herzegovina